Edmond Michiels (born 12 October 1913, date of death unknown) was a Belgian water polo player who competed in the 1936 Summer Olympics.

He was part of the Belgian team which won the bronze medal. He played two matches.

See also
 List of Olympic medalists in water polo (men)

External links
 

1913 births
Belgian male water polo players
Olympic bronze medalists for Belgium
Olympic water polo players of Belgium
Year of death missing
Water polo players at the 1936 Summer Olympics
Olympic medalists in water polo
Medalists at the 1936 Summer Olympics
Place of birth missing